The Men's 1,500m race for class T46 amputee athletes at the 2004 Summer Paralympics was a single race held in the Athens Olympic Stadium on 20 September. It was won by Samir Nouioua, representing .

Final round

20 Sept. 2004, 09:30

References

M